Markanda is a former name for the city of Samarkand in Uzbekistan.

Markanda may also refer to:

 Markandeya River, Eastern Ghats, a river in Karnataka and Tamil Nadu, India
 Markandeya River, Western Ghats, a river in Belgaum district, Karnataka, India
 Markanda River, Haryana, a seasonal river in India
 Shahabad Markanda, a town in Kurukshetra, Haryana, India
 Markanda Mahadev, Chamorshi, an 8th-century Hindu temple complex in Chandrapur, Maharashtra, India

People
 Markandey Chand, an Indian politician
 Markandey Katju, a judge of Supreme court of India
 Markandeya, an ancient Hindu rishi (sage)
 Ram Lal Markanda, Indian politician